Coleman is an unincorporated community in Drew County, Arkansas, United States. The Look See Tree, a lookout tree listed on the National Register of Historic Places, is located in Coleman.

References

Unincorporated communities in Drew County, Arkansas
Unincorporated communities in Arkansas